Shūichi, Shuichi or Shuuichi is a masculine Japanese given name. Notable people with the name include:

, Japanese politician
, Japanese footballer
, Japanese voice actor
, Japanese sport wrestler
, Japanese footballer and manager
, Japanese long-distance runner
, author of Initial D
, Japanese long-distance runner
, Japanese writer

Fictional characters
, the main character in the visual novel Danganronpa V3: Killing Harmony
, the main character of the manga and anime series Gravitation
, a character in the manga series Uzumaki
, a character in the manga series Hana-Kimi
, the main character of the manga and anime series Wandering Son
, a character in the manga series Case Closed / Detective Conan
, better known as Spinner, is a major antagonist of the manga and anime series My Hero Academia

Japanese masculine given names